Days Like These may refer to:

Film and TV
 Days Like These (film), a 2007 telemovie starring Lillian Crombie
 Days Like These (TV series), a 1999 British remake of the American sitcom That '70s Show

Music
 Days Like These (album), a 2008 album by Diesel
 "Days Like These" (Asia song), 1990
 "Days Like These" (The Cat Empire song), 2003
 "Days Like These", a song by Billy Bragg from Reaching to the Converted (1999)